In music theory, the circle of fifths is a way of organizing the 12 chromatic pitches as a sequence of perfect fifths. (This is strictly true in the standard 12-tone equal temperament system — using a different system requires one interval of diminished sixth to be treated as a fifth). If C is chosen as a starting point, the sequence is: C, G, D, A, E, B (=C), F (=G), C (=D), A, E, B, F. Continuing the pattern from F returns the sequence to its starting point of C. This order places the most closely related key signatures adjacent to one another. It is usually illustrated in the form of a circle.

Definition 
The circle of fifths organizes pitches in a sequence of perfect fifths, generally shown as a circle with the pitches (and their corresponding keys) in a clockwise progression. Musicians and composers often use the circle of fifths to describe the musical relationships between pitches. Its design is helpful in composing and harmonizing melodies, building chords, and modulating to different keys within a composition.

Using the system of just intonation, a perfect fifth consists of two pitches with a frequency ratio of 3:2, but generating twelve successive perfect fifths in this way does not result in a return to the pitch class of the starting note. To adjust for this, instruments are generally tuned with the equal temperament system. Twelve equal-temperament fifths lead to a note exactly seven octaves above the initial tone—this results in a perfect fifth that is equivalent to seven equal-temperament semitones.

The top of the circle shows the key of C Major, with no sharps or flats. Proceeding clockwise, the pitches ascend by fifths. The key signatures associated with those pitches also change: the key of G has one sharp, the key of D has 2 sharps, and so on. Similarly, proceeding counterclockwise from the top of the circle, the notes change by descending fifths and the key signatures change accordingly: the key of F has one flat, the key of B has 2 flats, and so on. Some keys (at the bottom of the circle) can be notated either in sharps or in flats.

Starting at any pitch and ascending by a fifth generates all twelve tones before returning to the beginning pitch class (a pitch class consists of all of the notes indicated by a given letter regardless of octave—all "C"s, for example, belong to the same pitch class). Moving counterclockwise, the pitches descend by a fifth, but ascending by a perfect fourth will lead to the same note an octave higher (therefore in the same pitch class). Moving counter-clockwise from C could be thought of as descending by a fifth to F, or ascending by a fourth to F.

Structure and use

Diatonic key signatures
Each of the twelve pitches can serve as the tonic of a major or minor key, and each of these keys will have a diatonic scale associated with it. The circle diagram shows the number of sharps or flats in each key signature, with the major key indicated by a capital letter and the minor key indicated by a lower-case letter. Major and minor keys that have the same key signature are referred to as relative major and relative minor of one another.

Modulation and chord progression
Tonal music often modulates to a new tonal center whose key signature differs from the original by only one flat or sharp. These closely-related keys are a fifth apart from each other and are therefore adjacent in the circle of fifths. Chord progressions also often move between chords whose roots are related by perfect fifth, making the circle of fifths useful in illustrating the "harmonic distance" between chords.

The circle of fifths is used to organize and describe the harmonic function of chords. Chords can progress in a pattern of ascending perfect fourths (alternately viewed as descending perfect fifths) in "functional succession". This can be shown "...by the circle of fifths (in which, therefore, scale degree II is closer to the dominant than scale degree IV)". In this view the tonic is considered the end point of a chord progression derived from the circle of fifths.

According to Richard Franko Goldman's Harmony in Western Music, "the IV chord is, in the simplest mechanisms of diatonic relationships, at the greatest distance from I. In terms of the [descending] circle of fifths, it leads away from I, rather than toward it." He states that the progression I–ii–V–I (an authentic cadence) would feel more final or resolved than I–IV–I (a plagal cadence). Goldman concurs with Nattiez, who argues that "the chord on the fourth degree appears long before the chord on II, and the subsequent final I, in the progression I–IV–viio–iii–vi–ii–V–I", and is farther from the tonic there as well. (In this and related articles, upper-case Roman numerals indicate major triads while lower-case Roman numerals indicate minor triads.)

Circle closure in non-equal tuning systems
Using the exact 3:2 ratio of frequencies to define a perfect fifth (just intonation) does not quite result in a return to the pitch class of the starting note after going around the circle of fifths. Equal temperament tuning produces fifths that return to a tone exactly seven octaves above the initial tone and makes the frequency ratio of each half step the same. An equal-tempered fifth has a frequency ratio of 27/12:1 (or about 1.498307077:1), approximately two cents narrower than a justly tuned fifth at a ratio of 3:2.

Ascending by justly tuned fifths fails to close the circle by an excess of approximately 23.46 cents, roughly a quarter of a semitone, an interval known as the Pythagorean comma. In Pythagorean tuning, this problem is solved by markedly shortening the width of one of the twelve fifths, which makes it severely dissonant. This anomalous fifth is called the wolf fifth – a humorous reference to a wolf howling an off-pitch note. The quarter-comma meantone tuning system uses eleven fifths slightly narrower than the equally tempered fifth, and requires a much wider and even more dissonant wolf fifth to close the circle. More complex tuning systems based on just intonation, such as 5-limit tuning, use at most eight justly tuned fifths and at least three non-just fifths (some slightly narrower, and some slightly wider than the just fifth) to close the circle. Other tuning systems use up to 53 tones (the original 12 tones and 42 more between them) in order to close the circle of fifths.

History

The circle of fifths developed in the late 1600s and early 1700s to theorize the modulation of the Baroque era (see ).

The first circle of fifths diagram appears in the Grammatika (1677) of the composer and theorist Nikolay Diletsky, who intended to present music theory as a tool for composition. It was "the first of its kind, aimed at teaching a Russian audience how to write Western-style polyphonic compositions."  

A circle of fifths diagram was independently created by German composer and theorist Johann David Heinichen in his Neu erfundene und gründliche Anweisung (1711), which he called the "Musical Circle" (German: Musicalischer Circul). This was also published in his Der General-Bass in der Composition (1728).

Heinichen placed the relative minor key next to the major key, which did not reflect the actual proximity of keys. Johann Mattheson (1735) and others attempted to improve this—David Kellner (1737) proposed having the major keys on one circle, and the relative minor keys on a second, inner circle. This was later developed into chordal space, incorporating the parallel minor as well.

Some sources imply that the circle of fifths was known in antiquity, by Pythagoras. This is a misunderstanding and an anachronism. Tuning by fifths (so-called Pythagorean tuning) dates to Ancient Mesopotamia; see , though they did not extend this to a twelve note scale, stopping at seven. The Pythagorean comma was calculated by Euclid and by Chinese mathematicians (in the Huainanzi); see . Thus, it was known in antiquity that a cycle of twelve fifths was almost exactly seven octaves (more practically, alternating ascending fifths and descending fourths was almost exactly an octave). However, this was theoretical knowledge, and was not used to construct a repeating twelve-tone scale, nor to modulate. This was done later in meantone temperament and twelve-tone equal temperament, which allowed modulation while still being in tune, but did not develop in Europe until about 1500.

Use
In musical pieces from the Baroque music era and the Classical era of music and in Western popular music, traditional music and folk music, when pieces or songs modulate to a new key, these modulations are often associated with the circle of fifths.

In practice, compositions rarely make use of the entire circle of fifths. More commonly, composers make use of "the compositional idea of the 'cycle' of 5ths, when music moves consistently through a smaller or larger segment of the tonal structural resources which the circle abstractly represents." The usual practice is to derive the circle of fifths progression from the seven tones of the diatonic scale, rather from the full range of twelve tones present in the chromatic scale. In this diatonic version of the circle, one of the fifths is not a true fifth: it is a tritone (or a diminished fifth), e.g. between F and B in the "natural" diatonic scale (i.e. without sharps or flats). Here is how the circle of fifths derives, through permutation from the diatonic major scale:

And from the (natural) minor scale:

The following is the basic sequence of chords that can be built over the major bass-line:

And over the minor:  

Adding sevenths to the chords creates a greater sense of forward momentum to the harmony:

Baroque era
According to Richard Taruskin, Arcangelo Corelli was the most influential composer to establish the pattern as a standard harmonic "trope": "It was precisely in Corelli's time, the late seventeenth century, that the circle of fifths was being 'theorized' as the main propellor of harmonic motion, and it was Corelli more than any one composer who put that new idea into telling practice."

The circle of fifths progression occurs frequently in the music of J. S. Bach. In the following, from Jauchzet Gott in allen Landen, BWV 51, even when the solo bass line implies rather than states the chords involved:

Handel uses a circle of fifths progression as the basis for the Passacaglia movement from his Harpsichord suite No. 6 in G minor.

Baroque composers learnt to enhance the "propulsive force" of the harmony engendered by the circle of fifths "by adding sevenths to most of the constituent chords." "These sevenths, being dissonances, create the need for resolution, thus turning each progression of the circle into a simultaneous reliever and re-stimulator of harmonic tension... Hence harnessed for expressive purposes." Striking passages that illustrate the use of sevenths occur in the aria "Pena tiranna" in Handel's 1715 opera Amadigi di Gaula:

– and in Bach's keyboard arrangement of Alessandro Marcello's Concerto for Oboe and Strings.

Nineteenth century
During the nineteenth century, composers made use of the circle of fifths to enhance the expressive character of their music. Franz Schubert's poignant Impromptu in E flat major, D 899, contains such a passage:

– as does the Intermezzo movement from Mendelssohn's String Quartet No.2:

Robert Schumann's evocative "Child falling asleep" from his Kinderszenen springs a surprise at the end of the progression: the piece ends on an A minor chord, instead of the expected tonic E minor.

In Wagner's opera, Götterdämmerung, a cycle of fifths progression occurs in the music which transitions from the end of the prologue into the first scene of Act 1, set in the imposing hall of the wealthy Gibichungs. "Status and reputation are written all over the motifs assigned to Gunther", chief of the Gibichung clan:

Jazz and popular music

The enduring popularity of the circle of fifths as both a form-building device and as an expressive musical trope is evident in the number of "standard" popular songs composed during the twentieth century. It is also favored as a vehicle for improvisation by jazz musicians.
 Bart Howard, "Fly Me to the Moon"

 Jerome Kern, "All the Things You Are"
 Ray Noble, "Cherokee." Many jazz musicians have found this particularly challenging as the middle eight progresses so rapidly through the circle, "creating a series of II–V–I progressions that temporarily pass through several tonalities."
 Kosmo, Prevert and Mercer, "Autumn Leaves"
 The Beatles, "You Never Give Me Your Money"
Mike Oldfield, "Incantations"
Carlos Santana, "Europa (Earth's Cry Heaven's Smile)"
Gloria Gaynor, "I Will Survive"
Pet Shop Boys, "It's a Sin"
Donna Summer, "Love to Love you, Baby"

Related concepts

Diatonic circle of fifths

The diatonic circle of fifths is the circle of fifths encompassing only members of the diatonic scale. Therefore, it contains a diminished fifth, in C major between B and F. See structure implies multiplicity.
The circle progression is commonly a circle of fifths through the diatonic chords, including one diminished chord. A circle progression in C major with chords I–IV–viio–iii–vi–ii–V–I is shown below.

Chromatic circle

The circle of fifths is closely related to the chromatic circle, which also arranges the twelve equal-tempered pitch classes in a circular ordering. A key difference between the two circles is that the chromatic circle can be understood as a continuous space where every point on the circle corresponds to a conceivable pitch class, and every conceivable pitch class corresponds to a point on the circle. By contrast, the circle of fifths is fundamentally a discrete structure, and there is no obvious way to assign pitch classes to each of its points. In this sense, the two circles are mathematically quite different.

However, the twelve equal-tempered pitch classes can be represented by the cyclic group of order twelve, or equivalently, the residue classes modulo twelve, . The group  has four generators, which can be identified with the ascending and descending semitones and the ascending and descending perfect fifths. The semitonal generator gives rise to the chromatic circle while the perfect fifth gives rise to the circle of fifths.

Relation with chromatic scale

The circle of fifths, or fourths, may be mapped from the chromatic scale by multiplication, and vice versa. To map between the circle of fifths and the chromatic scale (in integer notation) multiply by 7 (M7), and for the circle of fourths multiply by 5 (P5).

Here is a demonstration of this procedure. Start off with an ordered 12-tuple (tone row) of integers
 (0, 1, 2, 3, 4, 5, 6, 7, 8, 9, 10, 11)
representing the notes of the chromatic scale: 0 = C, 2 = D, 4 = E, 5 = F, 7 = G, 9 = A, 11 = B, 1 = C, 3 = D, 6 = F, 8 = G, 10 = A. Now multiply the entire 12-tuple by 7:
 (0, 7, 14, 21, 28, 35, 42, 49, 56, 63, 70, 77)
and then apply a modulo 12 reduction to each of the numbers (subtract 12 from each number as many times as necessary until the number becomes smaller than 12):
 (0, 7, 2, 9, 4, 11, 6, 1, 8, 3, 10, 5)
which is equivalent to
 (C, G, D, A, E, B, F, C, G, D, A, F)
which is the circle of fifths.
Note that this is enharmonically equivalent to:
 (C, G, D, A, E, B, G, D, A, E, B, F).

Enharmonic equivalents, theoretical keys, and the spiral of fifths

Equal temperament tuning does not use the exact 3:2 ratio of frequencies that defines a perfect fifth, whereas the system of just intonation uses this exact ratio. Ascending by fifths in equal temperament leads to a return to the starting pitch class—starting with a C and ascending by fifths leads to another C after twelve iterations. This does not occur if an exact 3:2 ratio is used (just intonation). The adjustment made in equal temperament tuning is called the Pythagorean comma. Because of this difference, pitches that are enharmonically equivalent in equal temperament tuning (e.g., D and C) are not equivalent when using just intonation.

In just intonation the sequence of fifths can therefore be visualized as a spiral, not a circle—a sequence of twelve fifths results in a "comma pump" by the Pythagorean comma, visualized as going up a level in the spiral. See also .

Without enharmonic equivalence, continuing a sequence of fifths results in notes with double accidentals (double sharps or double flats). When using equal temperament, these can be replaced by an enharmonically equivalent note.

Keys with double sharps or flats in the key signatures are called theoretical keys—their use is extremely rare. Notation in these cases is not standardized.

The default behaviour of LilyPond (pictured above) writes single sharps or flats in the circle-of-fifths order, before proceeding to double sharps or flats. This is the format used in John Foulds' A World Requiem, Op. 60, which ends with the key signature of G major, as displayed above. The sharps in the key signature of G major here proceed C, G, D, A, E, B, F.

Single sharps or flats in the key signature are sometimes repeated as a courtesy, e.g. Max Reger's Supplement to the Theory of Modulation, which contains D minor key signatures on pp. 42–45. These have a B at the start and also a B at the end (with a double-flat symbol), going B, E, A, D, G, C, F, B. The convention of LilyPond and Foulds would suppress the initial B.
Sometimes the double signs are written at the beginning of the key signature, followed by the single signs. For example, the F key signature is notated as B, E, A, D, G, C, F. This convention is used by Victor Ewald, by the program Finale (software), and by some theoretical works.

See also
 Approach chord
 Sonata form
 Well temperament
 Circle of fifths text table
 Pitch constellation
 Multiplicative group of integers modulo n
Multiplication (music)

Notes

References

Further reading
 D'Indy, Vincent (1903). Cours de composition musicale. Paris: A. Durand et fils.
 Lester, Joel. Between Modes and Keys: German Theory, 1592–1802. 1990.
 Miller, Michael. The Complete Idiot's Guide to Music Theory, 2nd ed. [Indianapolis, IN]: Alpha, 2005. .
 Purwins, Hendrik (2005)."Profiles of Pitch Classes: Circularity of Relative Pitch and Key—Experiments, Models, Computational Music Analysis, and Perspectives". Ph.D. thesis. Berlin: Technische Universität Berlin.
 Purwins, Hendrik, Benjamin Blankertz, and Klaus Obermayer (2007). "Toroidal Models in Tonal Theory and Pitch-Class Analysis". in: Computing in Musicology 15 ("Tonal Theory for the Digital Age"): 73–98.

External links
 Decoding the Circle of Vths
 Interactive Circle of Fifths
 Interactive Circle of Fifths Composing Tool
 Interactive circle of fifths for guitarists

 
Harmony
Musical keys
Tonality